Anton Lleshi (born 10 June 1993 in Mirditë) is an Albanian football player who plays for Albanian club KF Shënkolli. He has spent several seasons playing in the Albanian First Division. His main position is central forward.

References

External links
 Profile - FSHF

1993 births
Living people
Association football forwards
Albanian footballers
KS Kastrioti players
Besëlidhja Lezhë players
KS Iliria players
KF Erzeni players
KF Korabi Peshkopi players
KF Vushtrria players
Kategoria e Parë players
Kategoria e Dytë players